Michael Gerard Fitzgerald Martin (born 1962) is a British philosopher who is currently Wilde Professor of Mental Philosophy at the University of Oxford and Mills Adjunct Professor of Philosophy at UC Berkeley.

Education and career

Martin studied at Oxford University where he won The Henry Wilde Prize in Philosophy in 1985 and earned his D.Phil. in 1992.  He joined the faculty at University College London in 1992, and was promoted to Professor of Philosophy there in 2002.  He became Wilde Professor of Mental Philosophy in 2018, succeeding Martin Davies, who retired.

Philosophical work

Martin works in philosophy of mind, specifically perception.  He defends "naive realism" "the view that perception constitutively  involves relations of awareness of the ordinary, mind-independent world around us."

References

British philosophers
Philosophy academics
Living people
1962 births
Alumni of the University of Oxford
Fellows of Corpus Christi College, Oxford
Academics of University College London
Philosophers of mind
Wilde Professors of Mental Philosophy